James Stirratt Topping Kennedy GC (1930 – 21 December 1973) was a Scottish security guard for British Rail Engineering Limited (BREL) in Glasgow. He was posthumously awarded the George Cross in 1975 after he was killed by armed robbers who were attempting to steal BREL's payroll. He also received the Glasgow Corporation Medal of Bravery.

Kennedy's London Gazette citation appeared in a supplement to the issue of 14 August 1975, dated 15 August 1975:

Memorial
On 12 November 1981, at Glasgow Central station, a British Rail electric locomotive no. 86242 was named James Kennedy GC in his honour. This locomotive has been subsequently withdrawn and sold overseas.

On 21 December 2017 James Kennedy's three daughters and the Lord Provost of Glasgow unveiled a plaque in his honour at the entrance to Knorr Bremse's Springburn Works, the site of Kennedy's murder.

References

1930 births
1973 deaths
British recipients of the George Cross
Deaths by firearm in Scotland
1973 murders in the United Kingdom
People murdered in Scotland
Scottish murder victims
Security guards killed in the line of duty